So Far So Good is a compilation album by John Martyn, with selected tracks taken from the albums Bless The Weather, Solid Air and Sunday's Child.

Track listing

Side One
"May You Never"
"Bless The Weather"
"Head and Heart"
"Over The Hill"
"Spencer the Rover"

Side Two
"Glistening Glyndebourne"
"Solid Air"
"One Day Without You"
"I'd Rather Be The Devil"

External links
The Official John Martyn Website

References

John Martyn albums
1977 compilation albums
Albums produced by John Wood (record producer)
Island Records compilation albums